The dark-eared myza (Myza celebensis), also known as the lesser streaked honeyeater, is a species of bird in the family Meliphagidae.  It is endemic to the island of Sulawesi in Indonesia. There are two subspecies, Myza celebensis celebensis which is found in mountainous parts of northern, central and southeastern Sulawesi, and Myza celebensis meridionalis from mountains in southern Sulawesi.

Description
The sexes are similar in appearance in the dark-eared myza but males are heavier than females and have longer heads, bills, wings and tail. The head and neck are grey or olivaceous streaked with dark brown. The bill is dark-coloured, long and curved downwards, and there is a bare yellowish patch of skin surrounding the dark eye. The back, wings and tail are brown with streaks of darker brown and the underparts are also brown, but less streaked than the upper parts. Southern populations (subspecies meridionalis), have a greyer base colour.

Ecology
It feeds from flowers and is described as darting rapidly from one inflorescence to another in its quest for nectar.

Status
This means that it is considered by the IUCN to be of "least concern" as its range and population size exceed the threshold criteria for being listed in a more vulnerable category. One of the places where this bird can be seen is the Gunung Ambang Nature Reserve on Sulawesi.

References

Birds described in 1895
Endemic birds of Sulawesi
Myza
Taxonomy articles created by Polbot